Nandrolone furylpropionate (NFP) (brand name Demelon), also known as 19-nortestosterone 17β-(2-furanyl)propanoate, is a synthetic androgen and anabolic steroid and a nandrolone ester. It was developed and marketed by Mochida Pharmaceutical in Japan in the 1960s.

See also
 List of androgen esters § Nandrolone esters

References

Androgens and anabolic steroids
2-Furyl compounds
Nandrolone esters
Progestogens
Carboxylate esters